TRAPPIST-1 is an ultra-cool red dwarf star in the constellation Aquarius with a planetary system of seven known planets.

The star was discovered in 1999 and its planets were discovered in 2016 and 2017 based on observations from the Transiting Planets and Planetesimals Small Telescope (TRAPPIST) at La Silla Observatory in Chile and numerous other telescopes. Following the initial discovery of two terrestrial planets in orbit around TRAPPIST-1, a data "anomaly" was found to be caused by five more planets. Their orbital periods – the time each planet takes to orbit the star – range roughly from 1.5 to 19 Earth days. The gravity of TRAPPIST-1's planets holds them in orbital resonance, which could have existed since the formation of the planetary system. The planets are likely to be tidally locked to TRAPPIST-1, which would force them to keep the same side facing their host star at all times.

As many as four of the planets (d, e, f, g) are potentially hospitable to life, having orbits in the star's habitable zone. There is no clear evidence that any of the planets have an atmosphere and it is unclear whether the planets could retain an atmosphere given TRAPPIST-1's radiation emission. Given their low densities, the planets may consist of large amounts of volatile material.

Star 

TRAPPIST-1 is in the constellation Aquarius, five degrees south of the celestial equator. The star was discovered in 1999 by astronomer John Gizis and colleagues; the name is a reference to the TRAPPIST project that discovered the first two exoplanets around the star; other designations for the star are 2MUCD 12171, 2MASS J23062928–0502285, EPIC 246199087, K2-112, SPECULOOS-1 and TRAPPIST-1a. There is no evidence that TRAPPIST-1 has companion stars.

TRAPPIST-1 is a red dwarf, a cold star with a smaller mass than the Sun. Red dwarfs include the spectral types M and K, and TRAPPIST-1 belongs to class M. Its mass is about 8.98% of the Sun's mass, only barely sufficient mass to allow nuclear fusion to take place. Its radius is 11.9% that of the Sun, making the star slightly larger than Jupiter. While denser than the Sun, TRAPPIST-1 has an unusually low density for its kind of star. Its luminosity is only about 0.055% that of the Sun and is mostly infrared light; it is not variable and there is no evidence for a solar cycle. Dwarf stars like TRAPPIST-1 are over ten times more common than Sun-like stars and these stars are more likely to host small planets than Sun-like stars. The known planetary systems around ultracold stars contain multiple planets, but it is unclear how many such stars feature planets.

Stars like TRAPPIST-1 are so cold that clouds consisting of condensates and dust can form in their photosphere. Patterns of TRAPPIST-1's radiation indicate the existence of dust, which is distributed evenly across the star's surface. The faint radiation at short wavelengths (such as x-rays and UV radiation) that TRAPPIST-1 emits has been measured with the XMM-Newton satellite and in later surveys, although with low precision.

Rotation period and age 
Measurements by the Kepler space telescope published in 2017 showed that the star may instead rotate about every , though that may constitute the rotation period of active regions rather than stellar rotation according to Miles-Páez et al. (2019). , discrepancies between rotational data obtained by the Spitzer Space Telescope and Kepler space telescope remain unexplained. The rotation axis of TRAPPIST-1 might be slightly offset from that of its planets.
	
Based on a combination of techniques, an age of about  billion years has been established for TRAPPIST-1, making it older than the Solar System. TRAPPIST-1 is expected to shine for ten trillion years – about 700 times longer than the present age of the Universe – whereas the Sun will leave the main sequence (run out of hydrogen) in a few billion years.

Activity 

Numerous photospheric features have been detected on TRAPPIST-1. Possible faculae (bright spots) have been observed by the Kepler space telescope and Spitzer Space Telescope, but some of TRAPPIST-1's bright spots may be too large to count as faculae. A correlation between bright spots and flare activity has been found. The photospheric features may introduce inaccuracies in measurements of its planets. The effect of bright spots on the luminosity of TRAPPIST-1 may lead to the planets' densities being underestimated by  percent, and to incorrect estimates of their water content. The mean intensity of TRAPPIST-1's magnetic field is about  although many of its properties cannot be directly measured. This intense magnetic field is driven by chromospheric activity and may be capable of trapping coronal mass ejections.

Stars lose mass through the stellar wind. Garraffo et al. (2017) computed the mass loss of TRAPPIST-1 to be about  solar masses per year, about 1.5 times that of the Sun, while Dong et al. (2018) simulated the observed properties of TRAPPIST-1 with a mass loss of  solar masses per year. The stellar wind properties of TRAPPIST-1 are not precisely determined.

Planetary system 

All of them are much closer to TRAPPIST-1 than Mercury is to the Sun, making TRAPPIST-1 a very compact planetary system. No evidence of additional planets around TRAPPIST-1 has been found, and the existence of gas planets more than 4.6 times as massive as Jupiter with orbital periods of 1 year, and of planets more massive than 1.6 Jupiter masses at 5 years can be ruled out. A hypothetical eighth planet would be designated TRAPPIST-1i, and its orbital properties have been predicted under the assumption that it orbits exterior to planet h and is part of the planetary resonance. Kral et al. (2018) did not detect any comets around TRAPPIST-1, and Marino et al. (2020) found no evidence of a Kuiper belt although it is questionable that a Solar System-like belt around TRAPPIST-1 would be visible from Earth. Observations with the Atacama Large Millimeter Array telescope have found no evidence of a circumstellar dust disk.

The inclinations of the orbits relative to the system's ecliptic are less than one tenth of a degree, making TRAPPIST-1 the flattest planetary system in the NASA Exoplanet Archive. The orbits are highly circular, with minimal eccentricities, and well-aligned with the spin axis of TRAPPIST-1. The planets all orbit in the same plane and, from the perspective of the Solar System, move past ("transit") TRAPPIST-1 during their orbit and frequently pass in front of each other.

Size and composition 

The radii of the planets are estimated to lie within the range of 75% to 150% that of Earth, equivalent to Mars-sized to slightly larger than Earth. The planet–star mass ratio of the TRAPPIST-1 system resembles both the analogous ratio of the Solar System and the moons–planet mass ratio of the Solar System gas giants.

The TRAPPIST-1 planets are expected to have similar compositions to each other and to Earth. The estimated densities of the TRAPPIST-1 planets are lower than Earth's which may imply that their cores are smaller than that of Earth, that they have large amounts of volatiles, that their iron exists in an oxidised form rather than as a core, in a core that includes large amounts of other elements, or that they are rocky planets with less iron than Earth. The densities are too low for a pure magnesium silicate composition, requiring lower-density molecular compounds to be present, such as water. Planets b, d, f, g and h are expected to contain large quantities of volatile compounds. The planets may thus feature large atmospheres, oceans and quantities of ice. A number of composition scenarios are possible considering the large uncertainties in the density.

Resonance 

The planets are in orbital resonances, with the durations of their orbits having ratios of 8:5, 5:3, 3:2, 3:2, 4:3, and 3:2 between neighbouring planet pairs, and with each set of three being in a Laplace resonance. N-body simulations have shown that such resonances can remain stable over billions of years, but that their stability is strongly dependent on initial conditions; for many initial configurations they become unstable after less than a million years. Scientists have used this conditional stability to make estimates of the masses of the TRAPPIST-1 planets. The resonances enhance the exchange of angular momentum between the planets, resulting in variations – earlier or later – in their transit times (in front of TRAPPIST-1) that can be measured. These variations yield information on the planetary system, such as on the planets' masses when other techniques are not available. The resonances and the proximity to their host star have led to the planetary system being compared to the Galilean moons of Jupiter. Kepler-223 is another exoplanet system with a TRAPPIST-1-like long resonance.

The close distances of the planets to the host star TRAPPIST-1 result in strong tidal interactions, stronger than for Earth. Tidal forces are dominated by the star's contributions and result in all planets having reached an equilibrium with slow rotation of the planets and tidal locking, which can lead to the rotation of a planet getting synchronized to its revolution around its star. However, the mutual interactions of the planets could prevent them from reaching a full synchronisation by forcing periodic or episodic full rotations of the planets' surfaces with respect to the star – on timescales of several Earth years – which would have important implications for the climate of the planets. Vinson, Tamayo and Hansen (2019) found that the planets TRAPPIST-1d, e, and f likely have chaotic rotations due to interactions with each other, preventing them from becoming synchronized to the star. Lack of synchronization potentially makes the planets more habitable. Other processes that can act to prevent synchronous rotation are torques induced by stable triaxial deformation of the planets, which would allow them to enter 3:2 resonances.

The resonances continually excite the eccentricities of the TRAPPIST-1 planets, preventing their orbits from becoming fully circular. As a consequence, the planets of TRAPPIST-1 are likely to undergo substantial tidal heating, which would facilitate volcanism and outgassing, especially on the innermost planets. This heat source is likely dominant over the one provided by radioactive decay, although both have substantial uncertainties and are considerably less than the incoming stellar radiation. According to Luger et al. (2017), for the four innermost planets tidal heating is expected to be greater than the total inner heat flux on Earth, and Quick et al. (2020) suggest that heating in the outer planets could be comparable to that in the Solar System bodies Europa, Enceladus and Triton.

Even if tidal heating does not significantly alter the climates of the planets, tidal heating could influence the temperatures of the night sides and cold traps, where gases are expected to accumulate; it would influence the properties of subsurface oceans where volcanism and hydrothermal venting could occur. It could be sufficient to melt the mantles of the four innermost planets, in whole or in part, potentially forming subsurface magma oceans. Moreover, it would increase the degassing from the mantle and facilitate the establishment of atmospheres around the planets. Intense tides could fracture the planets' crusts, inducing earthquakes, even if they are not sufficiently strong to trigger the onset of plate tectonics. The TRAPPIST-1 planets may have substantial seismic activity due to tidal effects. Tidal phenomena can influence the masses of the planets observed from Earth. Tides can also be excited in the atmospheres of the planets, if atmospheres exist.

Skies and impact of stellar light 

Because TRAPPIST-1 radiates mostly infrared radiation, there is likely to be very little visible light on the planets' surfaces, with Amaury H.M.J. Triaud, one of their co-discoverers, suggesting that the skies would never be brighter than Earth's sky at sunset and only a little brighter than a night with a full moon. Ignoring atmospheric effects, illumination would be orange-red. All the planets would be visible from each other and would in many cases appear larger than the Moon in the sky of Earth; however, TRAPPIST-1e, f and g cannot experience any total eclipses. The longer wavelength of TRAPPIST-1's radiation compared to that of the Sun means that it would be absorbed to a greater degree by water and carbon dioxide. It would also be less scattered or reflected by ice, although the development of highly reflective hydrohalite ice may negate this effect. Consequently, the same amount of radiation results in a warmer planet compared to a Sun-like irradiation with more radiation being absorbed at the top of an atmosphere rather than the bottom.

Habitable zone 

For a dim star like TRAPPIST-1, the habitable zone is located closer to the star than for the Sun. , this is the largest known number of planets within the habitable zone of a star or star system. Whether liquid water actually occurs on any of the planets depends on several other factors, namely the albedo (reflectivity), the presence or absence of a strong greenhouse effect on each planet and presence or absence of an atmosphere. Hence, surface conditions are difficult to constrain without better knowledge of the planets' atmospheres. Additionally, a synchronously rotating planet might not necessarily freeze over entirely if it receives too little radiation from its star, since the dayside could be heated sufficiently to halt the progress of a glaciation. Other factors for the occurrence of liquid water include the presence of oceans and vegetation, the reflective properties of the land surface and the configuration of continents and oceans, cloud and sea ice dynamics. Inclusion of the effects of volcanic activity may extend the habitable zone of TRAPPIST-1 to TRAPPIST-1h.

Intense extreme ultraviolet (XUV) and X-rays can cause water to escape from planets, by splitting it into hydrogen along with oxygen gas, and heating the upper atmosphere until they escape from the planet. This was particularly important early in the star's history, when radiation was more intense and could have heated every planet's water to its boiling point. This process is believed to have removed the water from Venus. In the case of TRAPPIST-1, different studies with different assumptions on the kinetics, energetics and extreme ultraviolet emissions have come to different conclusions on whether any TRAPPIST-1 planet can retain substantial amounts of water. Additionally, given that the planets are most likely synchronized to their host star, water could become trapped on their night side and unavailable to support life, unless atmospheric heat transport or tidal heating are intense enough to melt the ice.

Moons 

No moons with a size comparable to Earth's have been detected around TRAPPIST-1, and moons are unlikely in such a densely packed planetary system. This is because such moons would likely be either torn apart by their planet's gravity after going inside the planet's Roche limit or stripped from the planet by going outside of the planet's Hill radius. While the TRAPPIST-1 planets appear in an analysis of potential exomoon hosts, they do not appear in the list of habitable zone exoplanets that could host a moon for a substantial amount of time. It is not impossible that the planets could host moons, though.

Magnetic effects 

The TRAPPIST-1 planets are expected to be within the Alfvén surface of their host star; the area around the star within which any planet would directly magnetically interact with the corona of the star, possibly destabilising any atmosphere the planet has. Estimates of radiation fluxes have considerable uncertainties owing to the lack of knowledge about the structure of the magnetic field of TRAPPIST-1.

Induction heating from time-varying electrical and magnetic fields of TRAPPIST-1 may occur on its planets but has no substantial contribution to their energy balance and is vastly exceeded by tidal heating.

Formation history 

The TRAPPIST-1 planets most likely formed at larger distances from the star and migrated inward, although they may have formed where they currently are. Ormel et al. (2017) proposed that the TRAPPIST-1 planets formed when a streaming instability at the water-ice line gave rise to precursor bodies, which accumulated additional fragments and migrated inward, eventually giving rise to the planets. The pace of migration may initially have been fast, then slow, and tidal effects may have further influenced the formation processes. The distribution of the fragments would control the mass the planets end up having at the end, and the planets would consist of  10% water, which is consistent with inference from observations. Resonant chains like these of TRAPPIST-1 usually become unstable when the gas disk that gave rise to them dissipates, but in this case they remained in the resonance. The resonance may have either been present from the start and was preserved when the planets moved inward simultaneously, or it might have formed later, when inward migrating planets accumulated at the outer edge of the gas disk and interacted with each other. Inward migrating planets would contain substantial amounts of water, too much for it to escape completely, whereas planets that formed in their current location would most likely lose it all. According to Flock et al. (2019), the orbital distance of the innermost planet TRAPPIST-1b is consistent with the expected radius of an inward moving planet around a star that was one order of magnitude brighter in the past and with the cavity in the protoplanetary disk created by TRAPPIST-1's magnetic field. Alternatively, TRAPPIST-1h may have formed in its current location or close to it.

The presence of additional bodies and planetesimals early in the system's history would have destabilised the TRAPPIST-1 resonance if the bodies were massive enough. Raymond et al. (2021) thus concluded that the TRAPPIST-1 planets assembled in 1–2 million years, and that once the assembly process was complete, only little additional mass was accreted. This would limit any late delivery of water to the planets and also implies that the planets cleared the neighbourhood of any additional material. The lack of giant impacts would help the planets preserve their volatile inventory.

Due to a combination of high insolation, the greenhouse effect of water vapour atmospheres and remnant heat from the process of planet assembly, the TRAPPIST-1 planets would likely have started off with a molten surface. The planets would have cooled until the magma oceans solidified, which might have taken between a few billions and a few millions of years in the case of TRAPPIST-1b. The outer planets would have become cold enough for water vapour to condense.

Potential atmospheres of the planets 

, there is no definitive evidence that any of the TRAPPIST-1 planets has an atmosphere. For a number of reasons, with existing telescopes and observations one cannot infer whether any of the planets around TRAPPIST-1 have an atmosphere or its composition. Several studies have simulated how various atmospheric scenarios would look to observations, and the chemical processes underpinning these atmospheric compositions.

The existence of atmospheres around TRAPPIST-1 planets is a function of the balance between the evaporation of such an atmosphere, the amount of atmosphere initially present and the rate at which it is built back up by the impact of meteorites, material incoming from a protoplanetary disk and outgassing/volcanic activity. Impact events would be particularly important in the outer planets, as impact events can both add and remove volatiles from the planets; in the outermost planets addition is likely dominant. The properties of TRAPPIST-1 are unfavourable to the continued existence of atmospheres around its planets; on the other hand the formation conditions of the planets would give them large initial volatile inventories, including oceans more than hundred times larger than Earth's. The outer planets are more likely to have atmospheres than the inner ones.

If the planets are tidally locked to TRAPPIST-1 and one side of their surface always faces away from the star, it can cool down sufficiently for any atmosphere to freeze out on the night side. This frozen-out atmosphere could be recycled through glacier-like flow of the frozen-out material to the dayside, helped by heating (tidal or geothermal) from below, or could be stirred by impact events. These processes could allow an atmosphere to persist. In the case of a carbon dioxide atmosphere, carbon dioxide ice is denser than water ice and thus tends to be buried under water ice; carbon dioxide-water compounds named clathrates can form; and a potential runaway feedback loop between ice melting and evaporation and the greenhouse effect additionally complicate matters.

Numerical modelling and observations constrain the properties of hypothetical atmospheres around TRAPPIST-1 planets:
 Theoretical calculations and observations have ruled out the possibility that the TRAPPIST-1 planets have hydrogen- or helium-rich atmospheres. Hydrogen-rich exospheres may be detectable still but have not been reliably detected except perhaps for TRAPPIST-1b and 1c by Bourrier et al. (2017).
 Water-dominated atmospheres, while suggested by some density estimates, are improbable for the TRAPPIST-1 planets as they are expected to be unstable under the conditions experienced around TRAPPIST-1, especially early in the star's life. The spectral properties of the planets imply that they do not have a cloud-free water-rich atmosphere.
 Oxygen-dominated atmospheres can form when radiation splits water into hydrogen and oxygen and the former escapes due to its lighter mass. The existence of such an atmosphere and its mass are a function of the initial water mass, of whether the oxygen is dragged out of the atmosphere by escaping hydrogen and of the state of the planet's surface; a partially molten surface could absorb large quantities of oxygen, sufficient to remove an atmosphere.
 Atmospheres formed by ammonia and/or methane are unstable around TRAPPIST-1, as they would be destroyed by the radiation of the star at a sufficient rate to quickly remove an atmosphere. The rate at which ammonia or methane are produced, possibly by organisms, would have to be considerably larger than on Earth to sustain such an atmosphere. It is however possible that the development of organic hazes from ammonia/methane photolysis could shield the remaining molecules from degradation caused by radiation. Ducrot et al. (2020) interpreted observational data as implying that methane-dominated atmospheres are unlikely around TRAPPIST-1 planets.
 Nitrogen-dominated atmospheres are particularly unstable with respect of atmospheric escape, especially on the innermost planets, although the presence of carbon dioxide may slow the evaporation. Unless the TRAPPIST-1 planets initially contained far more nitrogen than Earth, they are unlikely to still have such atmospheres.
 Carbon dioxide-dominated atmospheres only slowly escape, as carbon dioxide effectively radiates away energy and thus does not readily reach escape velocity; however, on a synchronously rotating planet it can freeze out on the nightside especially if there are no other gases in the atmosphere. The decomposition of carbon dioxide caused by radiation could yield substantial amounts of oxygen, carbon monoxide and ozone.

Theoretical modeling of Krissansen-Totton and Fortney (2022) suggest that the inner planets most likely have oxygen- and carbon dioxide-rich atmospheres, if any. If the planets have an atmosphere, the amount of precipitation, its form and where it occurs would be determined by the presence and position of mountains and oceans and the rotation period. The planets that are in the habitable zone are expected to have a global Rossby number larger than 1, which would make their atmospheres "tropical" with only small temperature gradients. Whether greenhouse gases could accumulate on the outer TRAPPIST-1 planets in sufficient quantities to warm them to the melting point of water is controversial. On a synchronously rotating planet, carbon dioxide could freeze and precipitate on the night side and ammonia and methane would be destroyed by the extreme ultraviolet radiation from TRAPPIST-1. Carbon dioxide freezing-out can occur only on the outermost planets unless special conditions are met, and other volatiles do not freeze out.

Detecting atmospheres around the TRAPPIST-1 planets may be possible. Because the visibility of an exoplanet and of its atmosphere scale with the inverse square of the radius of its host star, the atmospheres of the TRAPPIST-1 exoplanets could be detected in the future. Detecting individual components of the atmospheres (in particular carbon dioxide, ozone and water) would also be possible, although different components would require different conditions and different numbers of transits. A contamination of the atmospheric signals through patterns in the stellar photosphere is an additional problem.

Stability 

The emission of extreme ultraviolet radiation by a star has an important influence on the stability of the atmospheres of its planets, their composition and the habitability of their surface, as it can power the ongoing removal of atmospheres – atmospheric escape – from planets. M dwarfs emit large amounts of extreme ultraviolet radiation, and TRAPPIST-1 and the Sun emit about the same amount of extreme ultraviolet radiation. TRAPPIST-1 has been emitting radiation for much longer, and since its planets are much closer to their star than the Sun's, they receive a much more intense irradiation.  Extreme ultraviolet radiation-induced atmospheric escape has been observed on gas giants. The process of escape has been mainly modelled in the context of hydrogen-rich atmospheres, while little quantitative research has been done on other compositions such as water or carbon dioxide.

TRAPPIST-1 is moderately to highly active and this may be an additional hurdle for atmospheres and water to persist on the planets: 
 M dwarfs have intense flares; TRAPPIST-1 has about 0.38 flares per day and about 4 to 6 superflares per year. While such flares would have only small impacts on atmospheric temperatures, they affect the stability and chemistry of the atmospheres substantially. Samara, Patsourakos and Georgoulis (2021) argued that the TRAPPIST-1 planets are unlikely to be able to hold on atmospheres against coronal mass ejections.
 The stellar wind from TRAPPIST-1 may have a pressure a thousand times larger than that from the Sun, which could destabilise the atmospheres of the TRAPPIST-1 planets up to planet f, as the pressure would push the wind deep into their atmospheres; this would facilitate the evaporation of the atmospheres and the loss of water. Stellar wind-driven escape in the Solar System is largely independent on planetary properties such as mass, wind around TRAPPIST-1 could remove the atmospheres of its planets on a timescale of 100 million to 10 billion years.
 Ohmic heating of the atmosphere of TRAPPIST-1e, f, and g amounts to 5–15 times the heating from extreme ultraviolet radiation, and if the heat is effectively absorbed, could destabilise the atmospheres.

The history of the star also influences the atmospheres of its planets. Initially after its formation, TRAPPIST-1 would have been in a pre-main sequence state, which may have lasted between hundreds of millions of years and roughly two billion years. During this state, it would have been considerably brighter than today and the intense irradiation would have impacted the atmospheres of surrounding planets, vaporising all common volatiles such as ammonia, carbon dioxide, sulfur dioxide and water. Thus, all planets of the system would have been heated to a runaway greenhouse for at least part of their existence. The extreme ultraviolet radiation would have been even higher during the pre-main sequence stage as well.

List of planets

TRAPPIST-1b

The planet is not within the habitable zone as its expected irradiation is more than 4 times that of Earth. It has a measured diameter and mass slightly larger than Earth, but its density estimates imply that it actually does not consist exclusively of rock. Based on numerous climate models, the planet would have been desiccated by TRAPPIST-1's stellar wind and radiation and it could be losing hydrogen and therefore any hydrogen-dominated atmosphere extremely fast in TRAPPIST-1's environment.

TRAPPIST-1c

It is close enough to TRAPPIST-1 to be tidally locked and could have a thick Venus-like atmosphere or lack one altogether. TRAPPIST-1c is not within the habitable zone as it receives about twice as much irradiation as Earth and thus either was or still is a runaway greenhouse. Based on numerous climate models, the planet would have been desiccated by TRAPPIST-1's stellar wind and radiation. TRAPPIST-1c could harbour water only in specific settings on its surface. It may be losing hydrogen at a rate of  based on Hubble Space Telescope observations, although 2017 observations showed no escaping hydrogen.

TRAPPIST-1d

It is more massive than the planet Mars but is less dense. Based on fluid dynamical arguments, TRAPPIST-1d is expected to have weak temperature gradients on its surface if it is tidally locked, and may have significantly different stratospheric dynamics from Earth. Based on numerous climate models, the planet may or may not have been desiccated by TRAPPIST-1's stellar wind and radiation although density estimates of the planet, if confirmed, demonstrate that it is not dense enough to consist solely of rock. The current state of TRAPPIST-1d depends on its rotation and climatic factors like cloud feedbacks; it is close to the inner edge of the habitable zone, but whether it has liquid water or has suffered from a runaway greenhouse effect that would render it non-habitable is dependent on detailed atmospheric conditions. Water could most likely persist only in specific settings on the planet.

TRAPPIST-1e

It is expected to have been in the habitable zone for a long time, assuming only orbital perturbations. It has an Earth-like density. Based on numerous climate models, the planet is the most likely one to have retained its water, and the one most likely to have it in liquid form for many different climate states. A dedicated climate model project called TRAPPIST-1 Habitable Atmosphere Intercomparison (THAI) has been launched to study potential climate states of this planet.

TRAPPIST-1e is in a comparable position within the habitable zone to Proxima Centauri b. It also has an Earth-like density. TRAPPIST-1e could have kept up to several Earth ocean masses of water. Moderate quantities of carbon dioxide could warm TRAPPIST-1e up to temperatures adequate for liquid water to exist. Models of tidal effects on TRAPPIST-1e have been created.

TRAPPIST-1f

It is expected to have been in the habitable zone for a long time, assuming only orbital perturbations. It is likely too far away from its host star to sustain liquid water, instead forming an entirely glaciated snowball planet but moderate quantities of carbon dioxide could warm TRAPPIST-1f up to temperatures adequate for liquid water to exist. TRAPPIST-1f could have kept up to several Earth ocean masses of water that could make up as much as 50% of the planet's mass; it could thus be an ocean planet.

TRAPPIST-1g

It is likely too far away from its host star to sustain liquid water, instead forming a snowball. However, either moderate quantities of carbon dioxide or internal heat from radioactive decay and tidal heating may warm its surface to above the melting point of water. TRAPPIST-1g could have kept up to several Earth ocean masses of water and density estimates of the planet, if confirmed, demonstrate that it is not dense enough to consist solely of rock. It may consist of up to 50% water by mass.

TRAPPIST-1h

It is likely too far away from its host star to sustain liquid water and may instead be a snowball planet or resemble Titan and have a methane/nitrogen atmosphere. Large quantities of carbon dioxide, as well as hydrogen or methane or  internal heat from radioactive decay and tidal heating,  would be needed to warm TRAPPIST-1h up to temperatures adequate for liquid water to exist. TRAPPIST-1h could have kept up to several Earth ocean masses.

Possible life 
Detecting life at TRAPPIST-1 may be possible, and the star's planets are considered a promising target for such a detection. Theoretical estimates have indicated that on the basis of atmospheric stability, the probability of TRAPPIST-1e – the planet most likely to harbour life – to be actually inhabited is considerably less than that of Earth.
 Due to the multiple interacting planets, TRAPPIST-1 planets are expected to feature intense tides. If oceans are present, the tides could lead to alternate flooding and drying of coastal landscapes, triggering chemical reactions conducive to the development of life, favour the evolution of biological rhythms such as the day-night cycle which otherwise would not develop in a synchronously rotating planet, mix oceans, supply and redistribute nutrients, and stimulate periodic expansions of marine organisms such as red tides on Earth.
 TRAPPIST-1 may not produce sufficient quantities of radiation suitable for photosynthesis to support a biosphere like on Earth. Mullan and Bais (2018) proposed that radiation from flares may increase the photosynthetic potential of TRAPPIST-1 but Lingam and Loeb (2019) indicated that the photosynthesis potential would still be small.
 In light of the small distances between the planets of TRAPPIST-1, it is possible that microorganisms ripped from one planet while encased in rocks may arrive at another planet while still viable inside the rock, allowing life to spread between the planets if it originates on one.
 Too much UV radiation from a star can sterilise the surface but too little may not allow the formation of chemical compounds that give rise to life, and inadequate production of hydroxyl radicals by a weak stellar UV emission may allow gases such as carbon monoxide that are toxic to higher life to accumulate in the atmospheres of TRAPPIST-1 planets. The range of possibilities go from UV fluxes from TRAPPIST-1 unlikely to be much larger than these of early Earth even in the case that TRAPPIST-1's emissions of UV radiation are high, to sufficient to sterilise the planets if they do not have a protective atmosphere.  it is unclear which effect would predominate around TRAPPIST-1 although observations with the Kepler space telescope and the Evryscope telescopes indicate that the UV flux may be insufficient for both sterilisation and the formation of life.
 The outer planets in the TRAPPIST-1 system could feature subsurface oceans, similar to Enceladus and Europa in the Solar System. Chemolithotrophy, the growth of organisms based on non-organic reduced compounds, could sustain life in such oceans. Very deep oceans may be inimical to the development of life.
 The planets of the TRAPPIST-1 system may have enough water to completely submerge their surfaces. This would have important effects on whether life develops on the planets, as well as on their climates.

A search for technosignatures that would indicate the existence of past or present technology from the TRAPPIST-1 system in 2017 found only signals coming from Earth. In less than two millennia Earth will be transiting in front of the Sun (from the viewpoint of TRAPPIST-1), which would make it possible to detect life on Earth from TRAPPIST-1.

Research history and reception 

TRAPPIST-1 was discovered in 2000, during a survey of Two Micron All-Sky Survey data for the identification of close by ultra-cool dwarf stars. Its planetary system was discovered by a team led by Michaël Gillon, a Belgian astronomer of the University of Liege, in 2016, during observations made from the La Silla Observatory, Chile, using the TRAPPIST telescope, based on anomalies in the light curves measured by the telescope in 2015. Initially, they were interpreted as indicating the existence of three planets (TRAPPIST-1b, TRAPPIST-1c and a third planet). In 2016, the Spitzer Space Telescope, the ground-based TRAPPIST and TRAPPIST-North in the Oukaïmeden Observatory of Morocco, the South African Astronomical Observatory in South Africa and the Liverpool Telescopes and William Herschel Telescopes, both in Spain. revealed that this third planet was in fact multiple planets. The observations of TRAPPIST-1 are considered among the most important research findings of the Spitzer Space Telescope. Observations by the Himalayan Chandra Telescope, the United Kingdom Infrared Telescope and Very Large Telescope complemented the findings by the TRAPPIST telescope. Research since then has confirmed the existence of at least seven planets in the system, with their orbits constrained by measurements from the Spitzer and Kepler telescopes. The discovery of the TRAPPIST-1 planets is often incorrectly attributed to NASA, but in actuality the TRAPPIST project that led to their discovery involved funding from both NASA and the European Research Council of the European Union.

Public reaction and cultural impact 

The discovery of the TRAPPIST-1 planets drew widespread attention in major world newspapers, social media, streaming TV and websites. , the discovery of TRAPPIST-1 led to the largest single-day web traffic to the NASA website. NASA started a public campaign on Twitter to find names for the planets, which drew numerous serious and less serious responses, although the names of the planets will be decided by the International Astronomical Union. The dynamics of the TRAPPIST-1 planetary system have been represented as music, such as Tim Pyle's Trappist Transits, in Isolation's single Trappist-1 (A Space Anthem) and Leah Asher's piano work TRAPPIST-1. The alleged discovery of an SOS signal from TRAPPIST-1 was an April Fools prank by the researchers at the High Energy Stereoscopic System in Namibia. A giclée digital artwork of the TRAPPIST-1 system, TRAPPIST-1 Planetary System as seen from Space, was created in 2018 by Aldo Spadoni. A website was created dedicated to the TRAPPIST-1 system.

Exoplanets often feature in science fiction works. Books, comics and video games have featured the TRAPPIST-1 system, the earliest being The Terminator, a short story  by the Swiss author Laurence Suhner published in the same academic journal that announced the discovery of the TRAPPIST-1 planetary system. At least one conference has been set up to recognise works of fiction featuring TRAPPIST-1. The planets have been used as the basis of science education competitions, school projects and websites offering TRAPPIST-1-like planets as settings of virtual reality simulations exist, such as the "Exoplanet Travel Bureau" and the "Exoplanets Excursion" both of NASA. Scientific accuracy has been a point of discussion for such cultural depictions of TRAPPIST-1 planets.

Scientific importance 

TRAPPIST-1 has drawn intense scientific interest. Its planets are the most easily studied planets within the habitable zone outside of the Solar System, owing to their relative closeness, the small size of their host star, and the fact that, from Earth's perspective, they frequently pass in front of their host star. Future observations with space-based observatories and ground-based facilities may allow insights in the properties, such as density, atmospheres and biosignatures of TRAPPIST-1 planets; they are considered an important observation target for the James Webb Space Telescope and other telescopes under construction. Together with the discovery of Proxima Centauri b, the discovery of the TRAPPIST-1 planets and the fact that about three of TRAPPIST-1's planets are within its habitable zone has led to an upswing of studies on planetary habitability, and the planets are considered prototypical for the research on the habitability of M dwarfs. The star has been subject of detailed studies of its various aspects, including the possible effects of vegetation and whether an ocean could be detected by using starlight reflected off its surface, and even discussions of possible efforts to terraform its planets and difficulties inhabitants of the planets would face with interstellar travel and with discovering the law of gravitation.

The role that European Union funding played in the discovery of TRAPPIST-1 has been cited as an example of the importance of European Union projects, and the involvement of a Moroccan observatory as an indication of the role of the Arab world in science. The original discoverers were affiliated with universities spanning Africa, Europe and North America and the discovery of TRAPPIST-1 is considered to be an example of the importance of cooperation among multiple observatories. It is also one of the major astronomical discoveries from Chilean observatories.

Exploration 

TRAPPIST-1 is too far away from Earth to be reached by humans with current or expected technology. Spacecraft mission designs using present-day rockets and gravity slingshots would need hundreds of thousands of years to reach TRAPPIST-1; even a theoretical interstellar probe travelling at the speed of light would need decades to reach the star. The speculative Breakthrough Starshot proposal for sending small laser-accelerated unmanned probes would require around two centuries to reach TRAPPIST-1.

See also 
 HD 10180, a star with at least six known planets, and three more exoplanet candidates
 Tabby's Star, another star with notable transit data
 LHS 1140, another star with a planetary system suitable for atmospheric studies
 LP 890-9, the second-coolest star found to host a planetary system, after TRAPPIST-1.
 List of potentially habitable exoplanets

Notes

References

Sources

Further reading

External links 

 
 

 
2017 in space
J23062928-0502285
Aquarius (constellation)
M-type main-sequence stars
Planetary systems with seven confirmed planets
Planetary transit variables